This is a list of episodes from the fourth and final season of ALF. Most episode titles are named after popular songs.

Broadcast history
The season aired Mondays at 8:00-8:30 pm (EST) on NBC until March 1990. The final three episodes aired on Saturdays at 8:00-8:30 pm (EST). Reruns would air temporarily on Sundays at 8:30-9:00 pm (EST) during the follow-up to the spring lineup but, it would return to the series’s traditional slot for the final airings on NBC.

DVD release
The season was released on DVD by Lionsgate Home Entertainment.

Cast
 Paul Fusco as ALF (puppeteer, voice)
 Lisa Buckley as ALF (assistant puppeteer)
 Bob Fappiano as ALF (assistant puppeteer)
 Max Wright as Willie Tanner
 Anne Schedeen as Kate Tanner
 Andrea Elson as Lynn Tanner
 Benji Gregory as Brian Tanner
 Charles Nickerson as Eric Tanner
 Jim J. Bullock as Neal Tanner

Episodes

References

ALF (TV series) seasons
1989 American television seasons
1990 American television seasons